Ula Leni is a 2019 Sri Lankan Sinhala psychological thriller film directed by Hemantha Prasad as his maiden cinematic direction and produced by Arosha Fernando for P2 Bond & Wind Creations. The film stars only a small cast including Gayani Gisanthika and Sanjeewa Upendra in lead roles. Music composed by Chamara Nugaliyadde.

Cast
 Gayani Gisanthika as Rooth
 Sanjeewa Upendra
 Chameera Liyanage
 Terry Anton

References

External links
 Gajaman on YouTube
 Ulaleni on Facebook

2019 films
Sinhala-language films